Year 1115 (MCXV) was a common year starting on Friday (link will display the full calendar) of the Julian calendar.

Events

By place

Levant 
 September 14 – Battle of Sarmin: The Crusaders, under Prince Roger of Salerno, surprise and rout the Seljuk Turkish army (some 8,000 men), led by Emir Bursuq ibn Bursuq, at Sarmin (modern Syria). Bursuq barely avoids capture, and escapes with a few hundred horsemen. Roger reoccupies the fortress of Kafartab, and consolidates his territory around Antioch.
 The Crusader castle of Montreal (located in Jordan) is commissioned by King Baldwin I of Jerusalem, during an expedition against the Seljuk Turks.

Europe 
 February 11 – Battle of Welfesholz: Duke Lothair of Supplinburg joins the rebellious Saxon forces, and defeats the German Imperial Army of Emperor Henry V at Welfesholz, in Saxony-Anhalt (modern Germany).
 July 24 – Matilda, margravine of Tuscany, dies at Bondeno. During her reign she waged an intermittent war with Emperor Henry IV over the inheritance rights of her fiefs in Lombardy and Tuscany.

Asia 
 The Jin Dynasty (or Great Jin) is created by the Jurchen tribal chieftain Taizu (or Aguda). He establishes a dual-administration system: a Chinese-style bureaucracy to rule over northern and northeast China.
 The 19-year-old Minamoto no Tameyoshi, Japanese nobleman and samurai, gains recognition by suppressing a riot against Emperor Toba at a monastery near Kyoto (approximate date).

Mesoamerica 
 The Mixtec ruler Eight Deer Jaguar Claw (or 8 Deer) is defeated in battle and sacrificed by a coalition of city-states, led by his brother-in law 4 Wind, at Tilantongo in the Mixteca Alta region (modern Mexico).

By topic

Religion 
 Arnulf of Chocques is accused of sexual relations with a Muslim woman. He is briefly removed from his position as patriarch of Jerusalem. 
 Peter Abelard, French scholastic philosopher, becomes master of the cathedral school of Notre-Dame and meets Héloïse d'Argenteuil.
 Clairvaux Abbey is founded by Bernard, French abbot and a major leader in the reform of Benedictine monasticism, in France.
 Hugh of Saint Victor, French theologian and writer, joins the Victorines (at the Augustinian Abbey of St. Victor) in Paris.

Births 
 April 18 – Gertrude, German duchess and regent (d. 1143)
 September 18 – Wu, Chinese empress consort (d. 1197)
 Aubrey de Vere, 1st Earl of Oxford (approximate date)
 Berenguer Raymond, count of Provence (d. 1144)
 Erling Skakke, Norwegian nobleman (approximate date)
 Eustathius of Thessalonica, Byzantine archbishop (d. 1195)
 Euthymios Malakes, Byzantine bishop (approximate date)
 Fulk I FitzWarin (or Fulke), English nobleman (d. 1170)
 Gilbert FitzRichard de Clare, 1st Earl of Hertford (d. 1152)
 Hugo Etherianus, Italian cardinal and adviser (d. 1182)
 Joel ben Isaac ha-Levi, German rabbi and writer (d. 1200) 
 Li Tao (or Renfu), Chinese historian and writer (d. 1184)
 Magnus IV (the Blind), king of Norway (approximate date) 
 Pedro Fernández de Castro, Spanish nobleman (d. 1184)
 Peter Cellensis, French abbot and bishop (d. 1183)
 Roger de Pont L'Évêque, Norman archbishop  (d. 1181)
 Welf VI, margrave of Tuscany (House of Welf) (d. 1191)
 Wichmann von Seeburg, German archbishop (d. 1192)
 William V (the Old), marquis of Montferrat (d. 1191)

Deaths 
 July 8 – Peter the Hermit, French religious leader
 July 24 – Matilda, margravine of Tuscany (b. 1046)
 September 27 – Bonfilius, Italian Saint and bishop of Foligno
 December 22 – Olav Magnusson, king of Norway (b. 1099)
 December 23 – Ivo of Chartres, French bishop (b. 1040)
 December 30 – Theodoric II, duke of Lorraine
 Abu al-Mu'in al-Nasafi, Arab theologian (or 1114)
 Adela of Flanders, queen of Denmark (b. 1064)
 Artau II, count of Pallars Sobirà (approximate date)
 Eight Deer Jaguar Claw, Mixtec ruler (b. 1063)
 Gerberga (or Gerburge), countess of Provence
 Godfrey of Amiens, French bishop (b. 1066)
 Leo Marsicanus, Italian cardinal (b. 1046)
 Mazdali ibn Tilankan, Almoravid governor 
 Odo II (or Eudes), count of Champagne
 Reynelm (or Reinelm), bishop of Hereford
 Shin Arahan, Burmese religious adviser
 Tanchelm of Antwerp, Flemish priest
 Turgot of Durham, Scottish bishop

References